Birger Cnattingius (29 November 1875 – 19 February 1950) was a Swedish fencer. He competed in the individual épée event at the 1908 Summer Olympics.

References

External links
 

1875 births
1950 deaths
Swedish male épée fencers
Olympic fencers of Sweden
Fencers at the 1908 Summer Olympics
Sportspeople from Stockholm